Set Erik Adrian Summanen (born 19 October 1993), better known as Seth Everman, is a Swedish YouTuber and musician. Noted for his shaved head and habit of staring directly into the camera with a deadpan expression in his videos, he came to prominence for making comedic piano videos and parodies of popular songs. He has a large following across multiple social media platforms including Instagram, Tumblr, and Twitter, and is one of the most subscribed Swedish YouTubers.

Early life
Seth Everman was born Set Erik Adrian Summanen in Stockholm on 19 October 1993.

Career 
Everman created his YouTube channel in May 2013, but had gone viral on multiple occasions since 2006. Many of these viral videos did not show his face, but one of them that did was a viral video titled "Nyan Cat 10 HOURS REACTION VIDEO! (yes, I actually watched it for 10 hours)", published on 6 December 2011 on a channel called TheGamePro. The video received over 1.5 million views and was re-uploaded onto his Seth Everman channel under the title "my old secret videos" on 3 April 2018, accumulating another 2 million views.

In September 2015, Everman published a mashup on his Tumblr account of Drake's "Hotline Bling" combined with Nintendo 64 games such as The Legend of Zelda: Ocarina of Time, Super Mario 64, and Mario Kart. This post was his first viral video under the Seth Everman name, accumulating over 600,000 notes on the platform. The first video to go viral on the Seth Everman YouTube channel was called "When you're a classical pianist but you listened to hip hop once", posted on 13 February 2016. In the video, he turns a rendition of "Für Elise" into Eminem's "Mockingbird" and a rendition of "Moonlight Sonata" into Dr. Dre's "Still D.R.E.". The video has received over 30 million views as of January 2023.

In November 2019, Everman became the person with the most liked YouTube comment and the first comment to hit 1 million likes. The comment reads "i'm the bald guy" and was left under the music video for Billie Eilish's "Bad Guy". As of January 2023, the comment has over 3.25 million likes.

On 1 January 2023, Everman announced that he would be stepping away from his YouTube channel at the end of the year to focus on other projects and challenged himself to upload as much content as possible for the rest of the year, which he described as a chance to "make all the videos [he] never managed to make over the years".

References

External links
 
 

1993 births
Comedy YouTubers
Living people
Music YouTubers
Swedish Internet celebrities
Swedish YouTubers
YouTube channels launched in 2013